The following is a list of squads for each nation competing in football 5-a-side at the 2016 Summer Paralympics in Rio de Janeiro.

Group A

Brazil
The following is the Brazil squad in the football 5-a-side tournament of the 2016 Summer Paralympics.

Iran
The following is the Iran squad in the football 5-a-side tournament of the 2016 Summer Paralympics.

Morocco
The following is the Morocco squad in the football 5-a-side tournament of the 2016 Summer Paralympics.

Turkey
The following is the Turkey squad in the football 5-a-side tournament of the 2016 Summer Paralympics.

Group B

Argentina
The following is the Argentina squad in the football 5-a-side tournament of the 2016 Summer Paralympics.

China
The following is the China squad in the football 5-a-side tournament of the 2016 Summer Paralympics.

Mexico
The following is the Mexico squad in the football 5-a-side tournament of the 2016 Summer Paralympics.

Spain
The following is the Spain squad in the football 5-a-side tournament of the 2016 Summer Paralympics.

See also
 Football 7-a-side at the 2016 Summer Paralympics – Team squads

References

Squads
Paralympic association football squads